The Lutheran Church in Ireland is a Lutheran church, operating across the island of Ireland.

In 1955 the Lutheran church was re-established in Dublin and moved to the Catholic Apostolic Church/St. Finian’s Lutheran Church, Adelaide Road, Dublin. There was an earlier Lutheran Church in Poolbeg Street, which catered for mostly the Germans in Dublin. Schulze Registers documents the clandestine marriages (marriages to people outside the Lutheran community) which were performed in the German Protestant Lutheran Church in Poolbeg St. by Rev. J. G. F. Schulze.

The Lutheran Church in Ireland maintains a special relationship with the Evangelical Church in Germany and a majority of its members originally came from the German-speaking countries and regions in Europe. In January 2015, a non-stipendiary minister was ordained in Dublin by Frank Otfried July, the Landesbischof of the Evangelical-Lutheran Church in Württemberg.

The mother parish is located in Dublin. Although the services are mostly conducted in German, on the last Sunday of each month it is held in English. Services in German also take place in Belfast, Castlepollard, Cork, Galway, Killarney, Limerick, Sligo and Wexford.

In 2009, the Lutheran Church in Ireland had a baptised membership of 300. In the Republic of Ireland's census, the number of people listing Lutheranism as their religion was 756 in 2002 and 5,329 in 2016. In Northern Ireland the corresponding figures were 186 in 2001 and 294 in 2011.

References

External links
 Lutheran Church in Ireland 

Lutheranism in Europe
Lutheran World Federation members
Lutheranism in the United Kingdom
All-Ireland organisations
German diaspora in Europe
Protestantism in the Republic of Ireland
Lutheran denominations
Protestantism in Ireland
Religious organisations based in Ireland